The Constant is the debut studio album by English band I Blame Coco, released on 1 October 2010 by Island Records. The album spawned four singles: "Caesar" (which features Swedish singer Robyn), "Selfmachine", "Quicker" and "In Spirit Golden"; the latter was released digitally on 31 October 2010, one week before the album's UK release date.

Critical reception

The Constant received generally positive reviews from music critics. At Metacritic, which assigns a normalised rating out of 100 to reviews from mainstream publications, the album received an average score of 63, based on 11 reviews. Joe Vogel of PopMatters praised the album as "a worthy and promising debut", dubbing it "a young album that avoids certain risks [...], but there is a vitality and ambition to it that is rare and refreshing for pop music." The Daily Telegraphs Lucy Jones referred to the album as "a well-crafted and impressive debut" and wrote, "Although the album doesn't quite ignite, Sumner's innate talent shines through." Heather Phares of AllMusic concluded that the album "has enough strong moments to make it a promising debut from a group with plenty of confidence, personality and potential." Ian Gittins of Virgin Media found that Sumner "has spectacularly inherited her father's idiosyncratic musicality, with her husky, masculine tones and mannered whoops and yowls illustrating that she has paid close attention to her dad's vocal repertoire."

Louisa Emery of The Wharf expressed that "Coco has created an album that shows she is more than a over privileged kid playing popstar, even if it will do little to shake off her Sumner stigma." Ben Weisz of musicOMH noted that "The Constant isn't exceptional, but it does demonstrate a sophistication which sets her apart from the twee pop of some of her rivals." The Guardians Caroline Sullivan viewed the album as "essentially a mildly promising debut by an artist who can write a tune but not yet with any great distinction." At NME, Alex Denney described "Caesar" as a "good-ass pop tune", but stated that "for the most part The Constant boils down to a thin chart gruel, too lumpenly pitched between the Carling Academies and the cattle-grid nightclubs to leave a mark." Neil Condron of Clash characterised the album as "[p]redictably pristine, ultimately inessential". The Observers Killian Fox argued that "the album ends up feeling oddly flat. We are left with a sense of excitement unfulfilled."

Track listing

Charts

Release history

References

2010 debut albums
Albums produced by Klas Åhlund
Albums produced by Dan Carey (record producer)
Albums produced by Samuel Dixon
Eliot Sumner albums
Island Records albums